Dalibor Filipović (born 28 September 1974) is a Croatian retired football forward, who played for several Croatian and Slovenian football clubs and for DPMM FC of Brunei.

Club career
He started playing senior football in 1992/93 season while he was loaned to RNK Split. That season, club failed to reach the promotion to First league.

He was appointed manager of Uskok Klis in 2017, but was sacked near the end of the season. He later took charge at NK OSK and became manager of Sloga Mravinče in November 2022.

References

External links
 
 nzs.si
 
 eufo

1974 births
Living people
Footballers from Split, Croatia
Association football forwards
Croatian footballers
RNK Split players
HNK Hajduk Split players
NK GOŠK Dubrovnik players
NK Inter Zaprešić players
NK Neretva players
HNK Šibenik players
NK Varaždin players
NK Maribor players
NK Šmartno ob Paki players
AEL Limassol players
NK Šmartno 1928 players
DPMM FC players
Croatian Football League players
Slovenian PrvaLiga players
Cypriot First Division players
Croatian expatriate footballers
Expatriate footballers in Slovenia
Croatian expatriate sportspeople in Slovenia
Expatriate footballers in Cyprus
Croatian expatriate sportspeople in Cyprus
Expatriate footballers in Brunei
Croatian expatriate sportspeople in Brunei
Croatian football managers